The Mercury Sable is a range of automobiles manufactured and marketed by the Mercury brand of Ford Motor Company.  Introduced on December 26, 1985 as the replacement for the Mercury Marquis, the Sable marked the transition of the mid-size Mercury product range to front-wheel drive.

Over its production span, the Sable was Mercury's badge-engineered counterpart to the Ford Taurus, below the Grand Marquis in the Mercury range.  From the 1986 to 2005 model years, it was produced as a mid-size four-door sedan and five-door station wagon. For 2006, the Sable was replaced by the full-size Montego and mid-size Milan. It was reintroduced for 2008 as a full-size car, offered as a four-door sedan.

Because of declining sales, the Sable was discontinued after the 2009 model year, leaving no Mercury counterpart for the sixth-generation Taurus.  The final Sable was produced on May 21, 2009; in total, 2,112,374 Sables were produced during its 1985–2005 production.

The Sable nameplate derived from the small Russian mammal of the same name.

Background 
In early 1980, the Mercury Sable began development alongside the Ford Taurus; the $3.5 billion project would become the largest development ever undertaken by Ford at the time.  Originally intended to replace its full-size and mid-size rear-wheel drive product lines (Panther and Fox platforms, respectively), the Taurus/Sable were focused toward the mid-size segment in 1981, as the company felt stabilization of gasoline prices justified the continuation of its full-size model lines.  The Taurus was to replace the Ford LTD while the Sable replaced the Mercury Marquis.

While designed entirely in North America, the Taurus/Sable were designed under a similar approach as the Ford Escort, using an interdisciplinary team approach; each element of the vehicle was designed concurrently, including manufacturing and assembly.  Along with input from potential buyers (in stark contrast to the Edsel), Ford used reverse engineering of competitive vehicles as a design input tool.

During the development of the Sable, Mercury had become one of the final American brands to adopt front-wheel drive into its vehicle line.  In 1982, as a sedan/station wagon version of the Chevrolet Citation, General Motors produced the quartet of the Chevrolet Celebrity/Pontiac 6000/Oldsmobile Cutlass/Buick Century; a year later, Chrysler expanded its K cars into the mid-size segment with the first front-wheel drive Chrysler New Yorker.  Coinciding with the 1986 launch of the Sable, General Motors downsized Buick, Oldsmobile, and Pontiac full-size sedans to front-wheel drive, only slightly larger than the mid-size Sable.

For 1983, Mercury underwent a brand revision, with the Cougar reverting to its traditional role as a two-door personal coupe alongside the Ford Thunderbird; while retaining the same chassis underpinnings, the Thunderbird and Cougar underwent a complete exterior redesign, becoming the first Ford cars produced with highly aerodynamic designs, a central objective of the Taurus/Sable design.  The 1983 Cougar was well received in the marketplace (outselling the 1983 Thunderbird); Ford would choose to abandon "boxy" car design altogether, influencing other car manufacturers to follow suit during the 1980s.  Following the Thunderbird and Cougar, Ford introduced the 1984 Ford Tempo and Mercury Topaz.  The compact front-wheel drive replacements for the Ford Fairmont/Mercury Zephyr, the Tempo/Topaz marked the first use of aerodynamic body design by Ford for a sedan.

Release 
In mid-1985, Ford unveiled the Mercury Sable alongside the Ford Taurus as a 1986 model.  In place of a traditional auto show unveiling, the launch was held an MGM Studios soundstage (where Gone with the Wind was filmed). Ford workers came into the room, which was decorated in space-age decor, holding cups shaped like flying saucers and the Taurus and Sable were sitting behind a curtain.  With the flashing of strobe lights and a drum-roll, the curtain was pulled back and the two cars were revealed to the public. Ford planned a sensual marketing campaign for the Sable featuring singer and entertainer Bette Midler. However, Midler turned down Ford's offer and refused to appear in the ads, so Ford utilized an impersonator of Midler as a substitute. Midler sued in response, leading to the memorable case Midler v. Ford Motor Co. which clarified whether or not impersonations could be considered an appropriation of identity.

First generation (1986–1991) 

Launched at the end of 1985 as a 1986 model, the Mercury Sable replaced the Mercury Marquis as the mid-size Mercury line, slotted between the Topaz and Grand Marquis/Colony Park.  Developed alongside the Ford Taurus, the Sable was marketed alongside its Marquis predecessor for 1986, as Ford sought to protect its investment in the project.   

Though outsold by the Taurus (which would go on to become the best-selling car in the United States) by a wide margin, the Sable would prove successful on its own, competing with the Grand Marquis to serve as the highest-selling Mercury model line.  The Sable was on Car and Driver magazine's Ten Best list on its release in 1986 and again in 1990 and 1991. 

As Ford did not market the Mercury brand in Mexico, Ford of Mexico marketed the model line as the Ford Taurus.  In South Korea, the Mercury Sable was marketed by Kia alongside the Kia Potentia (Mazda Luce/929).

Chassis specification 
The first-generation Sable used the front-wheel drive Ford DN5 platform, sharing its  wheelbase with the Ford Taurus.  As with its Marquis predecessor, the Sable used unibody construction.  The Sable is equipped with four-wheel independent suspension. The front axle is fitted with MacPherson struts and a stabilizer bar; the rear axle on sedans is a coil-spring 4-link layout (also with MacPherson struts), while the rear suspension on station wagons was a coil-spring double-wishbone design (short/long arm), along with a stabilizer bar.  As with the Marquis, the Sable was equipped with front disc brakes and rear drum brakes; station wagons were fitted with larger rear brakes.

Powertrain 
For 1986, the Sable was offered was with two engines: a 90hp HSC I4 (mated to a three-speed automatic) and a 140hp Vulcan V6 (paired to a four-speed automatic).  Following poor sales of the 4 cylinder engine in the Sable, the engine was dropped from the line (though remaining standard on the Taurus through 1991), along with the 3-speed automatic.  For 1988, a 3.8L Essex V6 was introduced as an optional engine.  Though rated with the same 140hp output as the 3.0L Vulcan V6, the 3.8L V6 was rated with nearly 35% more torque output (popular in the heavier station wagons).     

In contrast to the Taurus, the first-generation Sable (nor any of its successors) was not offered with a manual transmission.

Body design 
The first-generation Sable was offered in two body styles: a four-door sedan and a five-door station wagon.  While its 1983-1986 Marquis predecessor shared nearly its entire body with its Ford LTD counterpart, the Sable sedan shared only its doors and roof stamping with the Taurus.  In what would become a tradition for four model generations, the station wagon body for both model lines was derived from the Sable; the Taurus wagon was styled with its own front fascia.    

To differentiate its 6-window roofline from the Taurus, the Sable sedan borrowed design elements from the Ford Scorpio liftback sedan, using blacked-out B, C, and D-pillars for a "floating roof" effect.  In place of the body-color grille insert used by Ford, the Sable was fitted with a low-wattage lightbar between the headlamps; the lightbar became a design feature later adapted by the Mercury Topaz and Tracer (and other automakers in the early 1990s).  The lightbar design element largely emphasized the lack of a conventional grille (while primarily a "bottom-breather" design, a vestigial air intake slot was also designed into the bumper below the lightbar); a design pioneered by the 1950s Citroën DS, within Ford, the configuration was also used by the Ford Mustang SVO and Ford Sierra.

As with its Marquis predecessor, the Sable station wagon was designed with a rear liftback, but introduced a new configuration for the rear hatch, allowing the rear window glass to be opened separately from the rest of the rear hatch.  In a design first for Mercury station wagons, exterior woodgrain trim was not offered as an option.  

Alongside the Taurus, the Sable was the first American-produced sedan to use aerodynamic composite headlights with replaceable halogen bulbs; to begin their use, Ford (and other auto manufacturers) lobbied the National Highway Traffic Safety Administration (NHTSA) to have them approved, with the 1984 Continental Mark VII becoming the first American car to use them.

While the Sable shared largely the same interior features as the Taurus, in a departure from tradition, the Sable was designed with a model-specific dashboard (partly integrated into the door panels).  Sable sedans were equipped with a 50/50 split bench seat as standard equipment (joining the Grand Marquis as a six-passenger Mercury sedan); as an option, front bucket seats were offered (reducing capacity to five).  The Sable wagon was offered with an optional rear-facing third-row seat, bringing seating to seven or eight; for the first time since the 1977 Cougar wagon, Mercury offered the design in its midsize station wagon.   

During its production, the first-generation Sable underwent few changes.  For 1989, the exterior underwent a mid-cycle revision; the amber parking lamp lenses were replaced by clear units and sedans saw revisions to taillamp lenses.  For 1990, the Sable underwent a redesign of the dashboard to accommodate the addition of a driver-side airbag; a CD player was added as an option.

Trim 
The first-generation Mercury Sable was sold in two trim levels (opposed to the four of the Taurus).  In line with other Mercury models, a base-trim GS (comparable to the GL-trim Taurus) and top-trim LS (slightly above the Taurus LX) was offered.  

As Mercury never offered the first-generation Sable with a manual transmission, no Mercury Sable equivalent to the Taurus MT-5 nor the Taurus SHO was ever introduced.

Production

Second generation (1992–1995) 

For the 1992 model year, the second-generation Sable was introduced.  As part of a $650 million investment in the Taurus and Sable, both model lines received significant updates, focusing on the interior and front and rear fascias.  In contrast to the previous Sable, Ford chose an evolutionary change for the model line; though visibly similar to the previous generation, every body panel on the Sable sedan (except the doors) was changed.  On the station wagon (shared with both the Sable and Taurus), the front fascia was redesigned, along with the interior.  

The interior of the Sable underwent a redesign of the door panels, dashboard, and interior controls.  Following the 1990 addition of a driver-side airbag, the Sable gained a passenger-side airbag as an option for 1992 (becoming standard in 1993).  For 1993, the steering wheel was redesigned (returning the horn to the center of the steering wheel).     

The base "GS" and luxury "LS" trim levels were carried over from the previous generation. A front cloth bench seat was standard on GS sedans and wagons, although cloth bucket seats were available on GS sedans only. Higher-end cloth bucket seats were standard on LS sedans, but a bench seat was a no cost option. A front bench was standard on LS wagons, with bucket seats optional. Leather seating surfaces were available on all LS Sables.

In 1992 for MY 1993, unpopular optional features such as the "InstaClear" heated windshield were eliminated. For 3.0 L V6 engines, the drive belt system became a single-belt setup for 1993 (previously, the 3.0 L alternator had used a separate belt).  Also some 3.0 L 1994 models began receiving the new AX4N transmission.

The wagon version was available with mostly the same options as the sedan versions. Wagons had a maximum of 81.1 cubic feet of cargo area with the 60/40 split rear seat folded down. They featured a 2-way liftgate (raise the entire liftgate or just the window), a roof rack with crossbar and tie-downs, an optional rear-facing third seat, a lockable under-floor compartment, and an optional fold-out picnic table. With both rear split seats in the upright position, standard cargo capacity was 45.7 cubic feet. Wagons that were equipped with the front bench seat and rear folding seat could seat eight people; while over two feet shorter than the 1991 Mercury Colony Park, the Sable wagon became the sole eight-passenger vehicle offered by Lincoln-Mercury (as the Mercury Villager minivan seated seven).

1995 was the final model year of the second-generation Sable; the rare LTS trim level was added.  It featured leather bucket seats, Taurus LX-style alloy wheels, special cladding, and many leather wrapped interior trim parts. The LTS trim had either the standard 3.0 L Vulcan V6 or the optional 3.8 L Essex V6.

Models

Production

Third generation (1996–1999) 

The third-generation Sable was introduced for the 1996 model year.  The platform used for the previous two generations underwent an extensive revision, redesignated as the DN101 platform; the wheelbase was extended from 106 to 108.5 inches.  As before, the Sable returned as a four-door sedan and five-door station wagon.    

While mechanically identical to its Ford Taurus counterpart, the sedans of the two model lines shared less sheetmetal than before, with only the front doors, hood, and front fenders common between the Taurus and Sable (as before, the Sable served as the basis for Ford and Mercury station wagons).   In contrast to the oval-influenced roofline of the Ford Taurus, the Sable was styled with a sloped roofline with a rectangular rear window; the model received its own front and rear fascias.  In place of the long-running lightbar, the Sable received a chrome-trimmed grille with oval headlight housings.  In a design first for the model line, the Sable was fitted with the same interior as the Taurus (with the exception of seat fabrics).        

The trim lines saw a minor revision, with the Sable G introduced as a new entry-level model and the Sable LTS discontinued.  The Sable G was offered solely as a sedan, with several standard power options (but only an AM/FM radio).  For higher sales volumes, the GS and LS made their return, offered both in sedan and station wagon form.  For the Sable G and GS, the standard engine was the 3.0L Vulcan V6, producing 145 hp.  For the Sable LS, the standard engine was a 3.0L DOHC Duratec V6, producing 200 hp; optional in the Sable GS, the Duratec engine was an enlarged version of the engine from the Mercury Mystique.       

For 1997, the Sable underwent several cost-cutting revisions; several features of the LS became available on the GS as options.  For 1998, the Sable underwent a mid-cycle revision, distinguished by new headlights and a centered Mercury emblem in the grille; the Sable G was discontinued.  The Vulcan V6 engine became standard on all Sables, with the Duratec optional only on the LS for 1999.   In an effort to stimulate sales, Mercury cut the price of the Sable by up to $2,000 for 1999 (by revising the availability of options).

Models

Fourth generation (2000–2005) 

The Sable received another redesign in 1999 for MY 2000, which minimized some of the oval design elements from the 1996 model, replacing them with more conventional styling. The redesign also featured a taller roof over the rear-passenger space, to increase passenger headroom that had been sacrificed by the tapered 1996 design. The taller and roomier trunk also served to make the vehicle more functional. The interior was completely changed for a much more conservative design. Certain elements of the interior were retained from the 1996 model, such as the integrated control console, which combined the sound system and climate controls into one panel; but the shape of that panel was changed from the controversial oval to a more conventional and conservative trapezoid. The suspension was also softened to appeal to a broader, non-sporting audience. To reduce the price and increase profitability, many features such as four-wheel disc brakes were eliminated  on the sedan; station wagons retained four-wheel disc brakes.

The 2002 Sable included extra equipment on every trim level, including a CD player and power driver's seat on the GS, and a power moonroof or leather interior on the LS. Side airbags and traction control were added as options on all models. For 2004, the Sable received minor cosmetic changes to the front and rear fascias, most noticeably the grille was made fully chrome. Inside were a new instrument cluster and steering wheel.

Due to the Mercury brand's discontinuation in Canada, the fourth generation Sable was never available in the Canadian market.  Thus it was unique to the US and Mexico.

The 2005 Mercury Montego and 2006 Milan were launched as replacements for the Sable. Shortly after the Montego's introduction the Sable was discontinued, along with the Taurus wagon; the Taurus sedan continued to be produced, but primarily for the fleet market. The last Sable left the Atlanta plant on April 29, 2005.

Models

Fifth generation (2008–2009)

The fifth-generation Mercury Sable was launched for the 2008 model year.  Developed as a mid-cycle update of the Mercury Montego, the production vehicle revived the more widely-recognized Sable nameplate at the 2007 Chicago Auto Show.  While the 2008 revival of the Ford Taurus (renaming the Five Hundred) largely ended retail sale of the Crown Victoria, the Sable remained below the Grand Marquis in the Mercury range.  

While approximately 10 inches shorter and 500 pounds lighter than the Grand Marquis, the fifth-generation Sable was the first produced as a full-size car.  For the first time, the model line was offered exclusively as a four-door sedan (no Mercury counterpart of the Taurus X wagon was developed).  Front-wheel drive remained standard, with all-wheel drive becoming an option for the first time.     

In the transition from the Montego to the Sable, a number of changes were made to the body and chassis.  Alongside the addition of the 263 hp 3.5L V6 and 6-speed 6F automatic, the exterior underwent several revisions, including a revised front bumper and grille, redesigned headlamps; the LED taillamps were retained, but given white lenses.  The fifth-generation Sable adopted the trim lines of the Montego and Milan, with an unnamed standard trim level and a top Premier trim.

Water pump issues
Water pumps on the 2008 to 2009 Mercury Sable equipped with the 3.5L Ford Cyclone V6 have a tendency to fail and potentially ruin the engine when they do. The water pumps on these engines are internally mounted and driven by the timing chain. As a result, when they fail, antifreeze is dumped directly into the crankcase; mixing with engine oil and potentially damaging the head gaskets and connecting rod bearings. These water pump failures could occur without warning, and repair could require engine disassembly or removal to access the water pump, or in some cases, engine replacement. A class action lawsuit was filed against Ford as a result of this issue.

Models

Special editions
A few rare special editions of the Sable were made, all consisting of first generation models.

During MY 1987, Mercury introduced a special edition of the Sable called the "LS Monochrome Edition", which as an option would color the bumpers, side trim, and wheels white. It was only offered during MY 1987; the production quantity is not known and it is also unknown how many still exist.

During MY 1989, Mercury created a "50th Anniversary" edition of the Sable, to celebrate Mercury's 50th Anniversary. Keeping with the name, only 50 were sold, combined between GS and LS models. This Sable was actually a test bed for creating a Luxury sports version of the Sable called the LTS, similar to that of the Ford Taurus SHO. It was meant to use the SHO's chassis, interior, and suspension, but not the engine. After the launch of the SHO, and all the publicity and praise it got, Ford shelved the Sable LTS to focus on the SHO, and because they were afraid it would take sales away from the SHO. The Sable LTS remained in a "development hell" until mid-1994 when it was introduced as a high end version of the Sable, but by then, it was just a highly optioned LS. An unknown number of these Sables still exist, but a pristine condition GS in this trim was sold on eBay in 2007.

A special one-of-a-kind Sable convertible was created in 1987 for the 1988 Detroit SAE auto show. It was built from a sedan chassis and featured a completely custom two-door body with a custom folding top. However, it was shelved; the only one sat in a warehouse for years until it was given a VIN, titled, and driven. It was sold on eBay in 2006.

General references 

http://www.leftlanenews.com/ford-taurus-x-mercury-sable-to-cease-production-next-year.html "Ford Taurus X, Mercury Sable to cease production next year (2009)".

Citations

External links

 Mercury Sable official site
 FAQ Farm's Mercury Sable FAQ: wiki question and answer forum
 Taurus Car Club of America
 TCCA: Taurus/Sable Encyclopedia

1990s cars
2000s cars
Cars introduced in 1986
Flexible-fuel vehicles
Ford Taurus
Front-wheel-drive vehicles
Full-size vehicles
Sable
Mid-size cars
Sedans
Station wagons
Cars discontinued in 2009